The men's 400 metres hurdles event at the 1998 World Junior Championships in Athletics was held in Annecy, France, at Parc des Sports on 28, 29 and 31 July.

Medalists

Results

Final
31 July

Semifinals
29 July

Semifinal 1

Semifinal 2

Heats
28 July

Heat 1

Heat 2

Heat 3

Heat 4

Heat 5

Participation
According to an unofficial count, 38 athletes from 28 countries participated in the event.

References

400 metres hurdles
400 metres hurdles at the World Athletics U20 Championships